Ei koskaan ("Never" in Finnish) is the fourth and last single from Ruoska's fifth album, Rabies.  It was released digitally on the band's official MySpace page in April 2008 and on EMI's website (along with the music video).

References

External links
 "Ei koskaan" lyrics

Ruoska songs
2008 singles
2008 songs
EMI Records singles
Song articles with missing songwriters